Scottish Squash (previously Scottish Squash and Racketball) is recognised by Sport England as the Scottish national governing body of the sport of Squash.

External links
 Official site

See also
 Scotland men's national squash team
 Scotland women's national squash team

Squash in Scotland
National members of the World Squash Federation
Sports governing bodies in Scotland